Chang Bunker and Eng Bunker (May 11, 1811 – January 17, 1874) were Siamese-American conjoined twin brothers whose fame propelled the expression "Siamese twins" to become synonymous for conjoined twins in general. They were widely exhibited as curiosities and were "two of the nineteenth century's most studied human beings".

The brothers were born with Chinese ancestry in Siam (now known as Thailand) and were brought to the United States in 1829. Physicians inspected them as they became known to American and European audiences in "freak shows". Newspapers and the public were initially sympathetic to them, and within three years they left the control of their managers, who they thought were cheating them, and toured on their own. In early exhibitions, they were exoticized and displayed their athleticism; they later held conversations in English in a more dignified parlor setting.

In 1839, after a decade of financial success, the twins quit touring and settled near Mount Airy, North Carolina. They became American citizens, bought slaves, married local sisters, and fathered 21 children, several of whom accompanied them when they resumed touring. Chang's and Eng's respective families lived in separate houses, where the twins took alternating three-day stays. After the Civil War, they lost part of their wealth and their slaves. Eng died hours after Chang at the age of 62. An autopsy revealed that their livers were fused in the ligament connecting their sternums.

The novelist Darin Strauss writes, "their conjoined history was a confusion of legend, sideshow hyperbole, and editorial invention even while they lived." Many works have fictionalized the Bunkers' lives, often to symbolize cooperation or discord, notably in representing the Union and Confederacy during the Civil War.

In Siam (1811–1829)

Chang and Eng were born in 1811 in Siam (modern-day Thailand). Their mother reportedly said their birth was no more difficult than that of their other several siblings. Their exact date of birth and details of their early lives are unclear. The earliest report on the twins assigns the birth month of May 1811. Their birth village is called Meklong (today's Samut Songkhram); a statue in the town commemorates the twins' birthplace.

Their father, Ti-eye, was a fisherman of Chinese descent. He died when the twins were young, possibly in a smallpox epidemic that ran through the area in 1819. Their mother, Nok, raised ducks with her children's help. Their mother's ethnic origin is unclear. Varying accounts suggest that she was Siamese, Chinese, part-Chinese and part-Siamese, or part-Chinese and part-Malay. Chang and Eng were raised as Theravada Buddhists. Despite being joined at the sternum, they were lively youths, running and playing with other children. Their mother raised them like her other children, in a "matter-of-fact" way without special attention on them being conjoined.

The "discovery" of the brothers is credited to the Scottish merchant Robert Hunter. Hunter was a trusted trade associate of the Siamese government who traveled with considerable freedom. In 1824, Hunter reportedly first met the twins while he was on a fishing boat in the Menam River and the twins were swimming at dusk. He mistook them for a "strange animal", but after meeting them he saw economic opportunity in bringing them to the West. 

He would later tell a story that the king of Siam had ordered the brothers' deaths and had originally forbidden him to transport them out of the country. Regardless of the story's veracity, it took five years for Hunter to bring them away. Hunter and American sea captain Abel Coffin departed to the United States with the twins in summer 1829. A contract Hunter and Coffin signed with the brothers stipulated that their tour would last for five years, though a rumor later circulated that Chang and Eng's mother had sold them into slavery, a charge that greatly upset the twins.

Christian missionaries contacted their mother in 1845, four years before she died. She had believed that her conjoined sons were dead, having not seen them for 15 years, but was informed that they were alive and recently married.

Travel and touring (1829–1839) 

Chang and Eng were 17 years old when they traveled to the United States with Hunter, Coffin, a crew of 18 men, and a Siamese translator. They arrived in Boston on August 16, 1829, and the next day the Boston Patriot confirmed Coffin and Hunter's ambitions: the twins "will probably be exhibited to the public". They were soon inspected by physicians, many of whom employed physiognomy and phrenology and judged them to be Chinese. Their arrival was excitedly reported in newspapers with varying degrees of racial stereotypes and falsehoods.

After leaving the United States they toured major cities in the British Isles, and by the time they returned to New York in March 1831, the twins had gained some skill in English reading, writing, and speaking. Newspapers reported that they had earned great profits, and their promotional materials began to describe their customers as dignified—though their act of exhibition could seem crude—to help bring more moneyed visitors.

The twins first appeared in London at the Egyptian Hall. They later toured Europe, then returned to the United States, appearing at dime museums and other venues. When touring in cities, the twins stayed at a hotel for several days (sometimes more than a week) and charged audiences to attend their "freak show". In small towns, their manager would send flyers ahead of their arrival, and they would remain at a lodge or inn for just one or two nights. Their first manager, James W. Hale, introduced them as the "Siamese Youths", a name they preferred to "boys". The usual admission price was 25 cents, and pamphlets and drawings featuring the brothers were usually also for sale. In early performances, the twins performed physical feats, running and doing somersaults. An emphasis was placed on their exoticness: they wore pigtails, dressed in "Oriental" clothing, and were soon billed as the "Siamese twins". Their performances occasionally featured swimming, playing checkers, and doing parlor tricks.

Conflicts on tour

In summer 1831, Hale took the twins on a retreat in Lynnfield, Massachusetts. While hunting game, they thought they were being taunted and harassed by over a dozen local men who had approached them, going on to strike a man named Elbridge Gerry with the butt of their gun. Gerry retaliated, throwing a heavy stone at one twin's head, drawing blood. The twins then fired at Gerry, though the gun was blank. The men ran off. The following day, one of the men pressed charges, alleging that the twins were at fault. A special court was convened, and the brothers were arrested for disturbing the peace and paid bond for good behavior.

The Salem Mercury portrayed the twins as the victims of the Lynnfield incident; other papers followed suit. Two weeks after the event, Gerry published a letter titled "To the Public", saying that the twins had provoked the violence. Hale was angered that the twins had gotten into a situation in which their public image could be slandered. He resigned as their manager in September 1831 and was replaced by a friend, Charles Harris. Hale counseled Harris; for example, he could avoid paying a Virginia exhibition tax through careful marketing: he was to call the twins' tour a "business", not a "show". In the public eye, Abel Coffin, the man who first brought them to the United States, continued to serve as a father figure to the twins.

The twins were soon involved in another conflict, during a performance in Alabama. A surgeon in attendance asked to conduct a close examination of the ligature connecting the twins. They refused, having not permitted close inspections for more than two years. Rising in anger, the doctor said, "You are all a set of impostors and pickpockets", and disorder erupted as guests threw objects across the room. The twins fled and later, because they probably were the first ones to disturb the peace, paid a good-behavior bond as ordered by a magistrate.

Relations between the twins and the Coffins strained beginning in January 1831 when Abel's wife, Susan Coffin, upset the twins by refusing their requests. Chang and Eng then started asking Harris to send letters pleading their cases. In one instance, Mrs. Coffin refused the twins an additional $3 per week to feed their horse, a refusal the twins compared to clipping a bird's wings and saying, "Now you may fly if you wish". Harris first maintained a distinction between his and the twins' point of view but eventually wrote using their voice and had them sign their names, "Chang Eng".

Abel Coffin left for Asia in late 1831 and planned to return to America by January 1832. After January passed, the twins' relations with Mrs. Coffin broke down completely, the twins regularly asking when Abel Coffin would return. They hoped to be free from commitment to the Coffins on their 21st birthday (in May 1832), as Abel had once promised. They also worried that, should he never return, they would remain in permanent limbo between contract and freedom. They began also to think that Mrs. Coffin was "deceitful and greedy" as they learned of the Coffins' management practices. For instance, Mrs. Coffin had encouraged them to perform when they were sick. During one trip, the Coffins had paid full fare for themselves but booked the twins into steerage, listing them as servants, and lied then to them when they were questioned. And the twins learned that Mrs. Coffin was willing to pay a higher wage only for a certain attendant, not the one whom the twins preferred. They jointly came to believe that Mrs. Coffin "had misled me".

Independent travel

Abel Coffin, upon returning to Massachusetts in July 1832, discovered that Chang and Eng were missing. Coffin accused Hale of "exciting his subjects to rebellion" (Hale had done no such thing), and after a chase he finally tracked down the brothers in Bath, New York. Hale later said Coffin told him he had met the twins "whoring, gaming, and drinking" and "gave Chang Eng 'the damndest thrashing they ever had in their lives'". On the twins' desertion, Coffin simply wrote to his wife as follows: "We have had much talk; they seem to feel themselves quite free from me."

The twins themselves did not immediately announce that they were in business on their own, nor did they much alter their public persona. Nonetheless, they were now exclusively referred to by their stage name—the "Siamese twins"—and they did change some parts of their performance, such as by wearing more American clothes, speaking English with the audience, and presenting themselves no longer as "boys" but men. They also answered audience questions sitting in a formal, parlor setting and hunted game in their free time. What had once essentially been their indentured servitude had changed to freedom; they were in command of their act and hired their own staff.

Chang and Eng did not perform on their sightseeing trip across Western Europe in 1835–36 visiting Paris, Antwerp, The Hague, Amsterdam, and other cities. In 1836, Hale published a pamphlet about them titled A Few Particulars concerning Chang-Eng, the United Siamese Brothers, Published under Their Own Direction. Positioning the twins as upper-class, saying that in Siam, Chinese were elites; it reported, among other particulars, that a representative of President Jackson had visited the twins' mother.

Settling and later years (1839–1874)

Traphill

The final setting for the Chang and Eng's on-and-off 1829–1839 tour was held in Jefferson, North Carolina, on July 3 and 4, 1839. According to a family friend, their move to Wilkes County, in the northwest of the state, allowed them to "engage in chasing stag and catching trout ... to enjoy the recreation which they had desired to find far away from the hurrying crowds." In October 1839, they purchased  for $300, near the rural community of Traphill, in mountainous northeast Wilkes County. The tract runs along Little Sandy Creek, near the Roaring River.

They soon became well acquainted with members of elite Wilkes society, including James Calloway and Robert C. Martin, both physicians; Abner Carmichael, the county sheriff; and James W. Gwyn Jr., the county's superior court clerk. Charles Harris, their former manager, relocated with them, and he became the Traphill postmaster. The month they bought the land, the twins (as well as Irish-born Harris) became naturalized citizens. Gwyn administered their oath of allegiance; despite a federal law from 1790 restricting naturalization to "free white persons", citizenship was a matter generally governed by local attitudes.

A home on Chang and Eng's Traphill land was constructed in 1840. The brothers would buy foodstuffs from Wilkes slaveholders and trade dry goods with their neighbors. They also bought slaves and hired several women as housekeepers; the twins' first slave was named "Aunt" Grace Gates. Prosperous from touring, they displayed their wealth through elegant house decorations; by the early 1840s, their property was the third-most valuable in the county at $1,000, . Settled, they planned to stop exhibiting for good, content to live in Traphill. The Whig Party newspaper Carolina Watchman of Salisbury called them "genuine Whigs", and the Boston Transcript reported that they were "happy as lords".

In 1840, a profile of the twins in the Tennessee Mirror made clear the twins' intentions to marry. Many newspapers regularly joked about this, discouraging their marriage not just with objections over the twins' deformity but also because of their race. Nevertheless, on April 13, 1843, Baptist preacher Colby Sparks officiated the weddings between Eng and Sarah Yates, and between Chang and Adelaide Yates. Though national (mainly Northern) newspapers generally condemned the marriages, there was probably little local reaction except purported vandalism of Sarah and Adelaide's parents' house the night before the wedding. The Bunkers would prominently feature their marriages when they went back on tour later in life.

By the late 1840s, the twins spoke English fluently, had voted, and had filed criminal charges against several white people. They had also adopted the English-language surname Bunker, in honor of a woman whom they met in New York and admired. Continued newspaper coverage, as visitors flocked to their Traphill home, established their place as national celebrities; and they felt themselves to be Americans. The Bunkers carved a unique place in Americans' perception of race—they were considered nonwhite but were afforded many of the privileges of White people, being fairly wealthy Southern slaveholders with property rights.

Mount Airy

The twins amassed wealth during the late 1840s and 1850s and lived in luxury as plantation owners. In 1850, it was estimated that they had invested $10,000 in property in North Carolina, . Meanwhile, they had a merchant in New York who managed another $60,000 for importing, and they lived off the interest.

For about a decade they split their time between Mount Airy and Traphill because their families had grown large; by 1847 Adelaide had delivered four children; Sarah, three. They would maintain the Traphill residence through 1853; later their time was divided solely between two homes located around Mount Airy. Then for the next decades, the twins would alternate which house they used, three days at a time; the twin who owned the current house could elect to do whatever he wanted while his brother complied and kept silent.

In 1850, ten of their 18 slaves were under the age of seven, some being owned only to be sold later for profit, and others growing up to work the fields. The Bunker plantations produced wheat, rye, corn, oats, and potatoes, and they raised cows, sheep, and pigs. Unlike families that owned many North Carolina farms, the Bunkers did not grow tobacco, which may suggest that their plantation was run primarily to feed the Bunker family and its slaves, not for commercial purposes. The press characterized the Bunkers' treatment of slaves as particularly harsh, though the twins decried accusations of cruelty and said that their wives supervised the slaves and raised money for their education.

Though the Bunkers were generally part of the region's aristocracy, some of their practices set them apart. They were occasionally seen performing manual labor; their method of chopping wood was particularly effective: they would wield an axe with all four hands, for more force, or would rapidly alternate turns swinging. They continued recreational hunting, and they took up fishing, drinking, and several sports.

Return to touring

Partial retirement ended up not suiting the Bunkers, and they sought to resume touring for what they called financial reasons: they said they needed to earn more money to support their then-seven children. They traveled to New York City in 1849 with daughters Katherine and Josephine, both aged five, but the brief tour petered out owing to poor management, and they returned to North Carolina. Advertisements had described them as "The Living Siamese Twins Chang-Eng and Their Children".

They conducted a successful year-long tour in 1853, again bringing two children (Christopher and Katherine). They again justified the tour by saying their motivation was to raise money to support their (by this point, 11) children's education. On this tour, viewings were like levees and were not elaborate, as the twins and their children usually sat, spoke, and mingled with the audience. Chang and Eng wore American suits and spoke in English about their marriages and families, and they also showed off their wit and political knowledge. They appeared educated and polite, according to biographer Joseph Andrew Orser, and "might have appeared as a distinguished southern family on display except for the fact that no family of distinction would exhibit itself to the public."

In early October 1860 they signed with famed showman P. T. Barnum for a month and exhibited in Barnum's American Museum in New York City. Alongside Zip the Pinhead, they performed for several distinguished guests, including the Prince of Wales; in 1868, they would briefly tour with Zip in the British Isles. Contrary to popular belief, Barnum did not create the Bunkers' careers; in fact, they were competitors in the entertainment business and the twins had already become world-famous from their own tours. The brothers and Barnum did not like each other, and the twins rejected Barnum's offer of a longer, countrywide tour.

They departed New York City on November 12, 1860, and took steamships and crossed Panama by train to arrive in San Francisco on December 6. Californians at the time were in the midst of figuring out how to deal with a recent influx of Chinese immigrants, and the arrival of the Bunkers (as well as two of Eng's sons, Patrick and Montgomery) was put in the spotlight. As usual, Chang and Eng were favorably received by audiences with whom they spoke, though reports of their performances in California took various perspectives on their race and nationality. Newspapers called them "yellow" but also the "greatest of living curiosities" who had "made much noise in the world, and are certainly worth seeing". They left California on February 11, 1861, by which time seven states had seceded from the United States, sparking the American Civil War. The Bunkers likely returned to their Mount Airy homes by April—after gunfire had begun in South Carolina, but before North Carolina seceded on May 20.

Civil War metaphor

Throughout the Civil War, the twins' conjoined state served in several metaphors. In July 1860, the Louisville Journal chided divisions in the Democratic Party by making the twins out to represent rival factions within the party, split on the extent to which slavery should be federally protected. The Bunker brothers were long-time supporters of the Whig Party, however, and a neighbor wrote to The Fayetteville Observer that they "are not now and never have been Democrats [and] they say they never expect to be Democrats". This neighbor also said that in the 1860 presidential election  both twins supported the Tennessean John Bell of the Constitutional Union Party, a candidate popular in northwestern North Carolina whose platform included both support of slavery and of preservation of the union.

More prominently, many newspapers fictitiously wrote that Chang and Eng were at odds with each other on the issue of secession, personifying fears of sectional violence. The New-York Tribune ran a colorful allegory that claimed to be an account of a dispute between the twins while they were at Barnum's American Museum. It says that Chang, the quarrelsome one, wants the ligament connecting them to be painted black (signifying the key issue of slavery) but that Eng does not. Chang says that his "union" with Eng is to be "dissolved", while a "Dr. Lincoln"  reasons that a separation surgery would be "dangerous for both parties"".

According to Orser, "The united brothers had become symbols of the American union and the promise it offered to its citizens." Orser adds that reports of conflict between the Bunkers did have some grain of truth: the brothers had legally divided their property, land and slaves, and they had created separate wills, formalizing the divided way they had lived since marriage.

Final years

By the time the Civil War ended in 1865, the twins' finances had suffered (they had lent money that was repaid in worthless Confederate currency) and their slaves were emancipated, so they decided to resume touring. Northern audiences at this point were not so receptive to the twins—for they had been Confederate slaveholders—so during tours they sympathetically presented themselves as old men, with many children, who only reluctantly supported their state over country and who each had a son hurt in the war, one injured and one captured (serving in the Confederate States Army). Newspapers disparagingly wrote that the twins had lost "a considerable number of slaves of about the same color of themselves" and claimed that the twins were taking advantage of their audience.

Chang and Eng made a trip to Britain in 1868–69, seeing physicians and chatting in exhibition; their last visit there had been over 30 years before. Chang's daughter Nannie, who had never before been far from home, and Eng's daughter Kate, both in their 20s, came on the trip, from North Carolina to Baltimore and New York, then across the Atlantic to Liverpool and into rural Scotland, later going to Manchester.

In 1870, Chang, Eng, and two sons went to Germany and Russia; they wanted to further explore Europe, but returned home to avoid the developing Franco-Prussian War. On the ship back home, Chang's right side (toward Eng) became paralyzed after he suffered a stroke, and they effectively retired, as Eng cared for Chang. The Bunker estate in 1870 was worth $30,000 in total, —two-thirds belonging to Chang.

Family

Sarah Yates Bunker was born on December 18, 1822, the fourth child and second daughter of David and Nancy Yates. Sometimes called "Mrs. Eng", she was seen as the simpler sister and, uneducated, lived frugally and was a capable chef. She was also described as the "more portly, fair one". 

Adelaide Yates Bunker, or "Mrs. Chang", was born on October 11, 1823. Taller and thinner than her older sister, she was said to have "excelled in personal beauty" and to have possessed a more refined taste. It was said that both Chang and Eng favored Sarah; according to a contemporary newspaper, however, "To any but an oriental taste, [Adelaide] was much the prettiest, being, in fact, a handsome and showy brunette." 

Both sisters outlived their husbands; Sarah died at age 69 on April 29, 1892. Adelaide died at age 93 on May 21, 1917.

Chang's and Eng's first children were born within six days of each other: Sarah gave birth to Katherine Marcellus on February 10, 1844; Adelaide, to Josephine Virginia on February 16. One set of cousins was born eight days apart: Chang's son Christopher and Eng's daughter Julia. Altogether, Chang and Adelaide had ten children and Eng and Sarah had eleven; in total, there were twelve daughters and nine sons; two children were deaf, two died from burns before the age of three and none were born as twins.

The twins occasionally attended church with their wives. Their children were for some time formally educated, and generally they were seen favorably; a profile of Chang and Eng said the children represented "a credit to their parents and the community in which they live".

, descendants of Chang and Eng's 21 children number about 1,500. Much of the extended family still lives in western North Carolina, and the family has hosted annual get-togethers since the 1980s, usually on the last Saturday of June. Chang's descendants include grandson Caleb V. Haynes, an Air Force major general, and his son Vance Haynes, an archaeologist; great-granddaughter Alex Sink, former Chief Financial Officer of Florida and the Democratic nominee for Governor of Florida in 2010; and great-great-granddaughter Caroline Shaw, a composer and the 2013 Pulitzer Prize for Music recipient. Eng's descendants include grandson George F. Ashby, president of the Union Pacific Railroad in the 1940s. The Bunker pedigree contains 11 sets of twins, none conjoined; the first set of twins, Eng's great-grandsons, were also named Chang and Eng.

Medical condition and deaths

Their livers were connected through the band, and only at the middle of the ligament did they share sensation.

Most physicians who met the twins recommended against surgery for separation, as with medical technology at the time it would have been a fatal procedure. Contemporary medical literature strongly suggests that the twins could have been easily separated today. Their autopsy was performed by surgeon William Pancoast of Philadelphia's Jefferson Medical College.

While Eng enjoyed good health toward the end of his life, most of Chang's right side became paralyzed in 1870 after his stroke, and eventually his right leg needed to be kept in a sling. From then on, Chang—becoming a heavy drinker—remained in poor health. Chang contracted bronchitis in January 1874, and the family physician recommended that he stay indoors and warm. On January 15, the Bunkers traveled through cold weather to Eng's house. Chang seemed to have recovered somewhat by the next day but at night was unable to breathe comfortably. On Chang's urging the brothers slept sitting upright on a chair, in front of a fireplace. Eng was healthy physically yet weary from spending the past week with a seriously ill Chang, so he asked to move to their bed after hours of drifting in and out of sleep.

Early in the morning of January 17, one of Eng's sons checked on the sleeping twins. "Uncle Chang is dead," the boy reportedly said to Eng, who responded, "Then I am going!" The family doctor was quickly sent for but Eng soon died, reportedly just over two hours after his brother's death. The Bunkers had the longest known lifespan (62 years) of any conjoined twins in history until 2012, when their record was surpassed by Ronnie and Donnie Galyon (1951–2020). Eng was remembered as a caring supporter of his brother, especially during their final years, when Chang developed severe illnesses. After their deaths, their good friend Jesse Franklin Graves recalled, "[Eng's] kindness was received with the warmest appreciation by Chang, whose disposition was very different from the morose, ill nature so falsely ascribed to him [by the press]."

Autopsy

The New York Herald ran a front-page story about the Bunkers' deaths, which attracted public demand for an autopsy as well as the attention of William Pancoast, who successfully petitioned for the opportunity to study the twins. It was rumored that Pancoast and other physicians had offered money to Chang and Eng's widows to inspect the twins, but more likely the doctors pressured the sisters into giving up the bodies by framing this donation as their "duty to science and humanity". The bodies were preserved for two weeks by the cold weather, and then an express train delivered them to the College of Physicians of Philadelphia, where the autopsy was performed and where preliminary findings were presented on February 18 while the autopsy was in progress.

The twins' final autopsy report said that Chang had most likely died of a cerebral blood clot; the cause of Eng's death was left unclear. Pancoast and colleague Harrison Allen attributed it to shock—that is, Eng "died of fright" upon seeing his dead brother—based on the fact that Eng's bladder had distended with urine and his right testicle had retracted. Others who worked on the autopsy suggested alternate theories, most prominently that Eng had died of blood loss as his circulatory system pumped blood through the connecting band into his dead brother's body and received no blood in return. "In the end," wrote academic Cynthia Wu in 2012, "that Eng died of fright prevails not only in the medical record but also in the popular-cultural imagination."

Legacy

The Bunker brothers coined the term "Siamese twins", and their fame made it a synonym for conjoined twins in colloquial use, even referring to those before the Bunkers' lifetime; however, modern researchers see the term as outmoded, preferring "conjoined twins". The phrase "like the Siamese twins" (or variations) was in use as early as October 1829 to describe other conjoined pairs, but over the decades use of the standalone "Siamese twins" became widespread. Chang and Eng are often referred to retrospectively as the "original Siamese twins".

Before the Bunkers' bodies were returned to North Carolina for burial (in 1917 they were moved to the cemetery at White Plains Baptist Church outside Mount Airy), doctors took photographs of the connecting tissue and hired sculptor John Casani to make a plaster cast of the twins. The Bunkers' fused livers are preserved in fluid and displayed in a clear jar along with the death cast in Philadelphia's Mütter Museum as a permanent exhibition. A basement room of the Andy Griffith Museum contains an exhibit on the twins. The Circus World Museum houses life-size figures of the twins. The Southern Historical Collection of the University of North Carolina at Chapel Hill keeps the Bunkers' personal papers.

In fiction

Many anonymous promotional pamphlets were printed depicting the Bunkers in artwork and literature, comprising early fiction pieces on the "Siamese twins"; the twins were used more metaphorically in later works. Edward Bulwer-Lytton's satirical poem The Siamese Twins was published while they toured Britain. Mentioning them in his novels The Confidence-Man and Billy Budd, Herman Melville also alludes to the Bunkers in Moby-Dick. The anti-socialist political cartoonist Thomas Nast in 1874 drew "The American Twins", in which a worker ("Labor") wears an apron next to a businessman ("Capital") with a sack of money who are joined at the chests with a band labeled "The Real Union". Before the United States entered World War II, Dr. Seuss used a "Siamese Beard" in his 1941 cartoon "The Great U.S. Sideshow" to attach a man with an America First shirt to Nazi Germany.

Mark Twain referenced conjoined twins in several ways, such as by wearing a pink sash connecting him to another man onstage at a New Year's Eve party; in "Personal Habits of the Siamese Twins" (1869), republished as "The Siamese Twins" in his 1875 collection Sketches New and Old, Twain provides an account of the Bunkers' lives, including both true and outlandish anecdotes. This satirical work, with Twain's typical deadpan humor, jokes about, among other things, the twins' different attitudes and their romantic pursuit of the same woman.

The musical Chang & Eng, directed by Ekachai Uekrongtham, has themes of open-mindedness and interdependence, and it opened in Singapore in 1997. Chang & Eng (2000), the debut novel of Darin Strauss, is a fictionalized account of the Bunker brothers' lives based on some historical context. Chang is the narrator in God's Fool (2002), Mark Slouka's first novel, and he has a hindsight letting him know the importance of future events. The play I Dream of Chang and Eng by playwright Philip Kan Gotanda, a "reimagining" of the twins' lives that departs somewhat from truthfulness, was workshopped and performed at UC Berkeley in 2011. Chang and Eng (played by Danial Son and Yusaku Komori) are featured in the musical biopic The Greatest Showman (2017) about the early years of the Barnum & Bailey Circus.

In the 1988 movie Dead Ringers, directed by David Cronenberg, identical twin brothers (both portrayed by Jeremy Irons) come to identify with the Siamese twins Chang and Eng, and the story of their sad death is evoked.

See also
 List of conjoined twins

Notes and references

Explanatory notes

References

Bibliography

Further reading

  
 Hunter, Kay (1964). "Duet For a Lifetime - The Story of the Original Siamese Twins". Michael Joseph Ltd, London. [Hunter is a descendent of Robert Hunter.]

External links

 The Chang and Eng Bunker Project at the University of North Carolina at Chapel Hill
 Bunkers Digital Collection at the University of North Carolina at Chapel Hill (View digitized collection)
 Chang and Eng Bunker Papers at the Southern Historical Collection
 Chang and Eng Exhibit (photographs with commentary) at the City University of New York

1811 births
1874 deaths
American people of Chinese descent
American slave owners
American twins
Burials in North Carolina
Conjoined twins
Naturalized citizens of the United States
North Carolina Constitutional Unionists
People from Mount Airy, North Carolina
Chang and Eng Bunker
People from Wilkes County, North Carolina
Sibling duos
Sideshow performers
Thai emigrants to the United States
Chang and Eng Bunker
Chang and Eng Bunker